Grete Brochmann (born 1 March 1957) is a Norwegian sociologist and Professor at the University of Oslo. Her main research field is international migration. She has been a visiting scholar the University of Louvain (UCLouvain) and the University of California, Berkeley. She chaired the Norwegian Welfare and Migration Committee, the so-called Brochmann Committee.

Publications
Brochmann, Grete & Hagelund, Anniken (2010). Velferdens grenser : Innvandringspolitikk og velferdsstat i Skandinavia 1945-2010. Universitetsforlaget.  .
Brochmann, Grete & Kjeldstadli, Knut (2008). A history of immigration. The case of Norway 900-2000.. Universitetsforlaget.  .
Brochmann, Grete (2006). Hva er innvandring?. Universitetsforlaget.  .

References

Norwegian sociologists
Norwegian women sociologists
Living people
1957 births
21st-century Norwegian writers
21st-century Norwegian women writers